"Anyone Who Had a Heart" is a song written by Burt Bacharach (music) and Hal David (lyrics) for Dionne Warwick in 1963. In January 1964, Warwick's original recording hit the Top Ten in the United States, Canada, Spain, Netherlands, South Africa, Belgium and Australia.

In the United Kingdom, the Republic of Ireland and New Zealand, Warwick's recording lost out to a cover version by Cilla Black.  Black's version was a UK number-one hit for three weeks in February/March 1964 and was also the fourth best-selling single of 1964 in the UK, with sales of around 950,000 copies.

Petula Clark also recorded "Anyone Who Had a Heart" in several foreign language versions for the international market. Clark reached No. 7 in France with "Ceux Qui Ont Un Coeur" in the spring of 1964, then No. 5 in Italy with "Quelli che hanno un cuore"1 that September.  In October 1964, Clark reached No. 1 in Spain—for a two-week period—with "Tú no tienes corazón".

Original recording
"Anyone Who Had a Heart" was presented to Dionne Warwick in unfinished form while she, Burt Bacharach and Hal David were rehearsing in Bacharach's Manhattan apartment for an upcoming recording session.  Bacharach had finished the score which, in his words, "changes time signature constantly, 4/4 to 5/4, and a 7/8 bar at the end of the song on the turnaround. It wasn't intentional, it was all just natural. That's the way I felt it." David had written only about a third of the lyric and was reluctant to finalize the sixth line of the first stanza as "And know I dream of you", feeling the stress was unnatural (as opposed to "And know I dream of you"). Bacharach played a snippet of the tune for Warwick, who was enraptured and at her urging David left Warwick to rehearse with Bacharach in the living room while he (David) retired to a bedroom where he completed the lyric. Of the unnatural stress in "I dream of you", David later stated: "I tried to find a way to make the you do something and I could never do it...[I] had to let it go."

Warwick recorded "Anyone Who Had a Heart" at Bell Sound Studios in Manhattan in November 1963, in a session produced by Bacharach and engineered by Ed Smith which also yielded "Walk On By" and "In the Land of Make Believe" and included session drummer Gary Chester. According to published reports, Warwick nailed the tune in only one take – though an alternative remix of the take appears on a compilation album released in 1976 by Springboard International.

Released on the Scepter label in November 1963, "Anyone Who Had a Heart" broke in Detroit, where it reached No. 1 that December. The track became Warwick's first Top Ten single in January 1964, peaking at No. 8 on the Billboard Hot 100 and the Cash Box Pop 100 that February, also reaching No. 6 on the Cash Box R&B chart. The track was also a hit in Canada, reaching No. 11 on the hit parade for Toronto radio station CHUM, the country's most influential rock music broadcaster (national charts for Canada were not published during the chart run of "Anyone Who Had a Heart").

Chart history

Cilla Black version

A scout for English record producer George Martin discovered "Anyone Who Had a Heart" when Warwick's version took off in the United States, suggesting to Martin that the song would be a strong UK single for Shirley Bassey. However, Martin saw the song as a vehicle for Cilla Black, the Liverpool vocalist whose star potential had yet to be realized despite her association with The Beatles, her recording of the Lennon-McCartney original "Love of the Loved" having been only a modest hit (No. 35). Martin produced the session for Black's recording of "Anyone Who Had a Heart" at Abbey Road Studios; the arrangement was by Johnny Pearson and the session personnel included guitarists Vic Flick and Big Jim Sullivan and backing vocalists The Breakaways.

Black's single of "Anyone Who Had a Heart" debuted at No. 28 on the UK Top 50 dated February 8, 1964. The Dionne Warwick original, issued by Scepter's UK licensee Pye Records, debuted on the chart for the following week at No. 42; by then Black's version had reached No. 10, ascending in the subsequent two weeks to No. 2 and then No. 1, while Warwick's version concurrently ended its chart run with two weeks at No. 47. On the chart dated February 29, 1964, besides Black's "Anyone Who Had a Heart" at No. 1 for the first of three weeks and Warwick's version in its final chart week at No. 47, the UK Top 50 featured a third version of "Anyone Who Had a Heart" as the version by Mary May made its one-week appearance at No. 49. On April 25, 1964, Billboard reported that the sales tally for Black's "Anyone Who Had a Heart" was nearing one million units.

Internationally, Black's version also reached No. 1 in Ireland, New Zealand and South Africa. In the Netherlands, the song reached No. 6, and in Australia it peaked at No. 34.

In May 2010, research published by BBC Radio 2 revealed that "Anyone Who Had a Heart" by Cilla Black was the biggest female UK chart hit of the 1960s.

Despite the international success and recognition of Warwick's original version, the besting in Great Britain by Black's version has long been a sore point with Warwick. In a 1995 edition of Great Performances which saluted Burt Bacharach, Warwick stated that Black's version of "Anyone Who Had a Heart" replicated Warwick's to the point where had Warwick coughed while recording her vocal for the original track or had that track's organist hit a wrong note, those features would have been present on Black's cover. In fact—whether intentionally or not—Black's original recording features distinct lyrics on the chorus, with Black singing "who couldn't be another heart" rather than the original and standard lyric "you couldn't really have a heart": Black has always sung the standard lyric in live performance. Also, arranger Johnny Pearson utilized a bassoon solo for the instrumental break in Black's version as opposed to the saxophone utilized in the Warwick original.

Cilla Black, interviewed for that Great Performances telecast, expressed her awareness of Warwick's disenchantment: "It was a No. 1; Dionne was dead choked and she's never forgiven me to this day."

It was in fact Burt Bacharach himself who backed Cilla to record this song for a British release, after Dionne Warwick had a hit in America with it. "At one point it looked as if Shirley Bassey would record the song...but The Beatles producer George Martin suggested Cilla and I agreed immediately. It was late in 1963 and Liverpool was taking over popular music with some great songs and great people. There was an awareness that things would never be quite the same again—and Cilla Black was part of that." Bacharach went on to say: "The great thing about the British is that they've always 'got' my songs right away. They are also one of the most loyal audiences in the world. I think Cilla reflected that kind of ability. She understood the song and she had a kind of long-term stickability, which is so very hard to achieve in this business."

Black recorded a new version of "Anyone Who Had a Heart" for her 1993 Through the Years album.

On 7 August 2015, following Black's death, the single re-entered the charts at No. 41.

Personnel
Cilla Black – lead vocals
The Breakaways – backing vocals
Vic Flick, Big Jim Sullivan – guitar

Atomic Kitten version

In 2007, Liz McClarnon, Natasha Hamilton, and Jenny Frost from English girl band Atomic Kitten recorded a cover version of the song, for the Liverpool – The Number Ones Album. The single was released on 27 January 2008 and peaked at number 77 on the UK Singles Chart.

Josie James version

"Anyone Who Had a Heart" was officially covered by American singer Josie James in 2012, for her album That Jazz.

In 2008, James performed the song on Bacharach's live album Live at the Sydney Opera House with the Sydney Symphony Orchestra. By popular demand and request of many fans, James chose to record the song for her upcoming album, "That Jazz". In 2011, James' husband Nigel Martinez arranged the song to be recorded along with two other musicians, Isaac Wilson (on piano) and Marlon Martinez (on bass). James and Martinez also re-arranged the music into a jazz song. The song appears on James' second album That Jazz as the opening song.

On May 26, 2014, she released a music video on YouTube. The music video was filmed using an iPhone 4s. The setting takes place in a studio as the musicians play the music to the song. Another scene shows Josie James performing the song as well relaxing on chair by a pool. The three musicians (Nigel Martinez, Wilson, Marlon Martinez) whom she recorded the song with also make an appearance in the video.

As of 2020, she continues to tour and perform the song with Burt Bacharach.

International hit
In Australia, both Dionne Warwick's and Cilla Black's versions of "Anyone Who Had a Heart" were released as singles: Warwick's version rose as high as No. 11, while Black's peaked at No. 34. Warwick had a hit with "Anyone Who Had a Heart" in Belgium (Flemish Region), the Netherlands and South Africa, reaching No. 4 in each territory.

Petula Clark was on the roster of Pye Records, Warwick's UK label, and therefore in a position to almost immediately cover "Anyone Who Had a Heart" in several foreign language versions for the international market. Clark reached No. 7 in France with "Ceux Qui Ont Un Coeur" in the spring of 1964, then No. 5 in Italy with "Quelli che hanno un cuore"1 that September; in October 1964 Clark reached No. 1 in Spain – for a two-week period – with "Tú no tienes corazón".

The success of Petula Clark's translated version did not preclude the Dionne Warwick original reaching No. 7 in Spain; Warwick's version also charted in France at No. 57 and in Italy at No. 30. In Germany, Clark's specialized cover, "Alles ist nun vorbei", was assigned a tandem chart ranking with both the Dionne Warwick and the Cilla Black versions, peaking at No. 37 in May 1964, marking Warwick's sole German chart entry until 1982's "Heartbreaker" and Black's sole German charting ever.

The orchestra on Petula Clark's versions of "Anyone Who Had a Heart" was conducted by Tony Hatch. The instrumentation differs from that of the versions by Dionne Warwick and Cilla Black in utilizing an organ for the solo on the instrumental break rather than a saxophone as on the Warwick original or a bassoon as on Black's cover.

Petula Clark has never recorded "Anyone Who Had a Heart" in English, feeling that both Dionne Warwick and Cilla Black have definitively rendered the song in its original language.

Italian singer Mina performed a version of "Quelli che hanno un cuore" to an unprecedented Italian viewing audience of twenty million watching an episode of the Canzonissima series, orchestrated by Bruno Canfora for an ensemble of 400 musicians on 14 December 1968.

Czech singer Marta Kubišová sang the song with Czech lyrics titled as "Denně čekám" (I'm Waiting Every Day).

Other versions

Dusty Springfield, who was a devotee of Warwick's records, cut a version of the song which may predate Cilla Black's: Springfield cut her version at Olympic Studios on January 21, 1964. It was included on her debut album A Girl Called Dusty. The Breakaways – who sang on Cilla Black's "Anyone Who Had a Heart" – also sing on Springfield's recording.

Shirley Bassey, the vocalist for whom "Anyone Who Had a Heart" was brought to the UK, recorded it only in 1978 for her The Magic Is You album with veteran producer Nick DeCaro. He had previously produced a version by Vikki Carr included on the 1968 album The Way of Today!.

Tim Curry recorded a cover of the song for his 1978 debut album Read My Lips.

The 1982 B.E.F. album Music of Quality and Distinction, Vol. 1 featured a rendering of "Anyone Who Had a Heart" by Sandie Shaw, marking a return to recording by the 1960s hitmaker, although that particular track would not be her comeback vehicle as despite its single release (credited to B.E.F. Presents Sandie Shaw) the track fell short of the UK Top 50; it was a lower chart item (No. 71) in Australia.

Atomic Kitten reunited to remake "Anyone Who Had a Heart" for the 2008 album Liverpool – The Number Ones Album, to which the group member Natasha Hamilton (with Kush) contributed a remake of Cilla Black's subsequent single and No. 1 "You're My World". Issued as a digital single release, "Anyone Who Had a Heart" spent one week on the UK charts at No. 77, the only UK charting of "Anyone Who Had a Heart" since the Cilla Black version. It sold 5,154 copies in the United Kingdom.

Shelby Lynne remade "Anyone Who Had a Heart" for her 2008 tribute album to Dusty Springfield, Just a Little Lovin'.

In 1993, Linda Ronstadt recorded the song for her album Winter Light.

In the US, the Dionne Warwick original remains the only version of "Anyone Who Had a Heart" to chart. In 1968, the Lettermen had a single release of the song as the B-side of their "bubbling under" hit "All the Grey Haired Men" (No. 109); it is the second track on the first side of their album "Goin' Out of My Head" (Capitol ST2865). Peter Rivera of Rare Earth sang lead on a 1975 remake of "Anyone Who Had a Heart" fronting HUB. In 2008, the Shelby Lynne recording from Just a Little Lovin''' was issued as a digital single release.

Wynonna Judd performed "Anyone Who Had a Heart" on the TNT special One Amazing Night broadcast in 1998; her version is included on the soundtrack album. Judd also performed the song with Dionne Warwick on the latter's 2006 duet-based album My Friends and Me''.

"Anyone Who Had a Heart" has also been recorded by Cheryl Baker, Michael Ball, Bec & Beth, Tim Curry, Barbara Dickson, Eve, The Four Seasons, Jan Graveson, Nicola Hitchcock, Vicky Leandros, Maureen McGovern, Anita Meyer, Olivia Newton-John, Maxine Nightingale, Páll Óskar, Inger Lise Rypdal, Martha Reeves and the Vandellas, Bic Runga, Luther Vandross, Silvie Paladino, Mari Wilson, Kim Wilde and Delta Goodrem.  Björk and The Brodsky Quartet performed an acoustic version of the song at London's Union Chapel in 1999 which has never been released.

References

2008 singles
1963 singles
1964 singles
1982 singles
Parlophone singles
Dionne Warwick songs
Cilla Black songs
Shelby Lynne songs
Atomic Kitten songs
Songs with lyrics by Hal David
Songs with music by Burt Bacharach
Song recordings produced by George Martin
Torch songs
UK Singles Chart number-one singles
Irish Singles Chart number-one singles
Number-one singles in New Zealand
1963 songs
Scepter Records singles